Rekha Raj (Malayalam: രേഖ രാജ്; born 5 May 1978) is a Dalit and feminist thinker, social activist and writer. She is one of the early   Dalit feminists  who  wrote  on caste and gender issues.

Early life
Raj was born to K P Nalinakshi and S Rajappan on 5 May 1978 in Kottayam, a central district of Kerala. She lives with her husband M. R. Renukumar and son. With a PhD in philosophy under the title "Politics of Gender and Dalit Identity: Representation of Dalit Women in Contemporary Dalit Discourses in Kerala", she was working as assistant professor at the School of Gandhian Thought and Development Studies in Mahatma Gandhi University, however her appointment was annulled by the High Court of Kerala citing irregularities in the appointment.

Works
Raj has written a book titled Dalit Sthree Idapedalukal in 2015, which was translated into Tamil in 2017. She was a guest editor of the Sanghaditha magazine special issue on Dalit Women in 2013. She has written many articles both in academic and other magazines including Economic and Political Weekly, Mathrubhumi, Samakalika Malayalam Vaarika, Madhyamam Weekly and many other current periodicals in India.  Her areas of academic interest are extended to gender, development, ethnic, cultural, dalit and subaltern studies.

Awards and honors
 2012: Rahna Award from Mochitha Sthree Padana Kendram, Alappuzha.
 Raj is an alumnus of international visitors leadership program by United States of America government.

References

External links
പ്രശസ്ത ദളിത്- സ്ത്രീ ചിന്തക രേഖ രാജ് ഇനി എംജി സർവകലാശാലയിൽ അസിസ്റ്റന്‍റ് പ്രൊഫസർ

Thousands turn up for long march against CAA

Malayali people
Indian feminists
Living people
1978 births
Dalit women writers
Dalit writers
Indian women activists
Writers from Kerala
Women writers from Kerala
Dalit activists
Activists from Kerala
Indian feminist writers
Writers from Kottayam